Tiberias Subdistrict was one of the subdistricts of Mandatory Palestine, and as of 1945 it was part of the Galilee District.

According to the 1947 partition plan, the district was to belong entirely to the Jewish state. After the 1948 Arab-Israeli War, small areas south and east of the Sea of Galilee were conquered by the Syrian Army and became No Man's Land, while the whole of the sub-district became the modern Kineret sub-district Kinneret County in the North District

Borders
 Safad Subdistrict (North)
 Acre Subdistrict (West)
 Beisan Subdistrict (South)
 Nazareth Subdistrict (West)
 Syria (East)

Depopulated towns and villages

 Awlam
 al-Dalhamiyya
 Ghuwayr Abu Shusha
 Hadatha
 al-Hamma
 Hittin
 Kafr Sabt
 Lubya
 Ma'dhar
 al-Majdal
 al-Manara
 al-Manshiyya

 al-Mansura
 Nasir ad-Din
 Nimrin
 al-Nuqayb
 Samakh
 al-Samakiyya
 al-Samra
 al-Shajara
 Tabgha
 Al-'Ubaydiyya
 Khirbat al-Wa'ra al-Sawda'
 Yaquq

Subdistricts of Mandatory Palestine